The following is a partial list of currently operating state schools in the unitary council areas of Scottish Borders, Shetland Islands, South Ayrshire, South Lanarkshire, Stirling, West Dunbartonshire, West Lothian and Western Isles in Scotland, United Kingdom. You may also find :Category:Schools in Scotland of use to find a particular school. See also the List of the oldest schools in the United Kingdom.

By unitary council area.

Note that the allocations to address and council area may not be accurate in every case and you can help if you have access to local directories.

Scottish Borders

Primary schools

Ancrum Primary School, Ancrum
Ayton Primary School, Ayton
Balmoral Primary School, Galashiels
Broomlands Primary School, Kelso
Broughton Primary School, Broughton
Burgh Primary School, Galashiels
Burnfoot Community School, Hawick
Channelkirk Primary School, Oxton
Chirnside Primary School, Chirnside
Clovenfords Primary School, Clovenfords
Cockburnspath Primary School, Cockburnspath
Coldingham Primary School, Coldingham
Coldstream Primary School, Coldstream
Denholm Primary School, Denholm
Drumlanrig St Cuthbert's Primary School, Hawick
Duns Primary School, Duns
Earlston Primary School, Earlston
Eddleston Primary School, Eddleston
Edenside Primary School, Kelso
Ednam Primary School, Ednam
Eyemouth Primary School, Eyemouth
Fountainhall Primary School, Fountainhall
Glendinning Terrace Primary School, Galashiels
Gordon Primary School, Gordon
Greenlaw Primary School, Greenlaw
Halyrude Primary School, Peebles
Heriot Primary School, Heriot
Jedburgh Grammar Campus, Jedburgh (ages 3–18)
Kingsland Primary School, Peebles
Kirkhope Primary School, Ettrickbridge
Knowepark Primary School, Selkirk
Langlee Primary School, Galashiels
Lauder Primary School, Lauder
Lilliesleaf Primary School, Lilliesleaf
Melrose Primary School, Melrose
Morebattle Primary School, Morebattle
Newcastleton Primary School, Newcastleton
Newlands Primary School, West Linton
Newtown Primary School, Newtown St Boswells
Philiphaugh Community School, Selkirk
Priorsford Primary School, Peebles
Reston Primary School, Reston
Sprouston Primary School, Sprouston
St. Boswells Primary School, St Boswells
St. Joseph's R.C. Primary School, Selkirk
St. Margaret's R.C. Primary School, Galashiels
St. Peter's Primary School, Galashiels
St. Ronan's Primary School, Innerleithen
Stirches Primary School, Hawick
Stow Primary School, Stow
Swinton Primary School, Swinton
Trinity Primary School, Hawick
Tweedbank Primary School, Tweedbank
Walkerburn Primary School, Walkerburn
West Linton Primary School, West Linton
Westruther Primary School, Westruther
Wilton Primary School, Hawick
Yarrow Primary School, Yarrow
Yetholm Primary School, Town Yetholm

Secondary schools
Berwickshire High School, Duns
Earlston High School, Earlston
Eyemouth High School, Eyemouth
Galashiels Academy, Galashiels
Hawick High School, Hawick
Jedburgh Grammar Campus, Jedburgh (ages 3–18)
Kelso High School, Kelso
Peebles High School, Peebles
Selkirk High School, Selkirk

Special schools
Wilton Centre, Hawick

Shetland Islands

Primary schools
Aith Junior High School, Bixter (ages 3–16)
Baltasound Junior High School, Baltasound, Unst (ages 3–16)
Bell's Brae Primary School, Lerwick
Brae High School, Brae (ages 3–18)
Burravoe Primary School, Burravoe, Yell
Cullivoe Primary School, Cullivoe, Yell
Cunningsburgh Primary School, Cunningsburgh
Dunrossness Primary School, Dunrossness
Fair Isle Primary School, Fair Isle
Fetlar Primary School, Fetlar
Foula Primary School, Foula
Hamnavoe Primary School, Burra
Happyhansel Primary School, Walls
Lunnasting Primary School, Vidlin
Mid Yell Junior High School, Mid Yell (ages 3–16)
Mossbank Primary School, Mossbank
Nesting Primary School, Skellister
North Roe Primary School, North Roe
Ollaberry Primary School, Ollaberry
Sandness Primary School, Sandness
Sandwick Junior High School, Sandwick (ages 3–16)
Scalloway Primary School, Scalloway
Skeld Primary School, Skeld
Sound Primary School, Lerwick
Tingwall Primary School, Tingwall
Urafirth Primary School, Hillswick
Whalsay School, Symbister (ages 3–16)
Whiteness Primary School, Whiteness

Secondary schools
Aith Junior High School, Bixter (ages 3–16)
Anderson High School, Lerwick 
Baltasound Junior High School, Baltasound, Unst (ages 3–16)
Brae High School, Brae (ages 3–18)
Mid Yell Junior High School, Mid Yell (ages 3–16)
Sandwick Junior High School, Sandwick (ages 3–16)
Whalsay School, Symbister (ages 3–16)

South Ayrshire

Nursery schools
Cherry Tree Early Years Centre, Ayr
Girvan Early Years Centre, Girvan
Space Place Early Years Centre, Prestwick
Wallacetown Early Years Centre, Ayr

Primary schools
Alloway Primary School, Alloway
Annbank Primary School, Mossblown
Ballantrae Primary School, Ballantrae
Barassie Primary School, Barassie
Barr Primary School, Barr
Barrhill Primary School, Barrhill
Braehead Primary School, Ayr
Cairn Primary School, Maybole
Colmonell Primary School, Colmonell
Coylton Primary School, Coylton
Crosshill Primary School, Crosshill
Dailly Primary School, Dailly
Dalmilling Primary School, Ayr
Doonfoot Primary School, Ayr
Dundonald Primary School, Dundonald
Fisherton Primary School, Dunure
Forehill Primary School, Ayr
Gardenrose Primary School, Maybole
Girvan Primary School, Girvan
Glenburn Primary School, Prestwick
Grammar Primary School, Ayr
Heathfield Primary School, Ayr
Holmston Primary School, Ayr
Kincaidston Primary School, Ayr
Kingcase Primary School, Prestwick
Kirkmichael Primary School, Maybole
Maidens Primary School, Girvan
Minishant Primary School, Minishant
Monkton Primary School, Prestwick
Muirhead Primary School, Troon
Newton Primary School, Ayr
Sacred Heart Primary School, Girvan
Straiton Primary School, Maybole
Struthers Primary School, Troon
Symington Primary School, Symington
St. Cuthbert's Primary School, Maybole
St. John's Primary School, Ayr
St. Ninian's Primary School, Prestwick
St. Patrick's Primary School, Troon
Tarbolton Primary School, Tarbolton
Troon Primary School, Troon

Secondary schools
Ayr Academy, Ayr
Belmont Academy, Ayr
Carrick Academy, Maybole
Girvan Academy, Girvan
Kyle Academy, Ayr
Marr College, Troon
Queen Margaret Academy, Ayr
Prestwick Academy, Prestwick

Special schools
Invergarven School, Girvan
Southcraig School, Ayr

South Lanarkshire

Nursery schools
Avondale ELC, Strathaven
Ballerup Nursery Centre, East Kilbride
Calderside Nursery, Blantyre
Cathkin Community Nursery, Whitlawburn
Early Learning Unit, Hamilton
First Step Community Nursery, Hamilton
Glenburgh Nursery, Rutherglen
Halfmerke Community Nursery, East Kilbride
Hollandbush Nursery, Hamilton
Kilbryde ELC, East Kilbride
Kirkstyle ELC, Carluke 
Larkhall Children's Centre, Larkhall
Lightburn ELC, Halfway
Millburn ELC, Newton
Rigside and Rural Communities Nursery, Lanark
Rooftop Nursery, East Kilbride
Springlaw ELC, Springhall
Westburn Nursery, Cambuslang
 Woodhill ELC, Kirkmuirhill 
Woodlands Nursery Centre, Hamilton

Primary schools
Abington Primary School, Abington
Auchengray Primary School, Carnwath
Auchinraith Primary School, Blantyre
Auldhouse Primary School, Auldhouse
Bankhead Primary School, Rutherglen
Beckford Primary School, Hamilton
Bent Primary School, Lesmahagow
Biggar Primary School, Biggar
Black Mount Primary School, Biggar
Blacklaw Primary School, St Leonards 
Blackwood Primary School, Kirkmuirhill
Bothwell Primary School, Bothwell
Braehead Primary School, Lanark
Braidwood Primary School, Braidwood
Burgh Primary School, Rutherglen
Burnside Primary School, Burnside
Cairns Primary School, Halfway
Calderwood Primary School, Rutherglen
Canberra Primary School, Westwood
Carluke Primary School, Carluke 
Carmichael Primary School, Thankerton
Carnwath Primary School, Carnwath
Carstairs Junction Primary School, Carstairs Junction
Carstairs Primary School, Carstairs
Castlefield Primary School, Greenhills
Cathkin Primary School, Cathkin 
Chapelton Primary School, Chapelton
Chatelherault Primary School, Hamilton
Coalburn Primary School, Coalburn
Coulter Primary School, Biggar
Craigbank Primary School, Larkhall
Crawford Primary School, Crawford
Crawforddyke Primary School, Carluke
Crosshouse Primary School, Greenhills
Dalserf Primary School, Ashgill
David Livingstone Memorial Primary School, Blantyre
Douglas Primary School, Douglas
East Milton Primary School, Westwood
Forth Primary School, Forth
Gilmourton Primary School, Strathaven
Glassford Primary School, Glassford
Glengowan Primary School, Larkhall
Glenlee Primary School, Burnbank
Greenhills Primary School, Greenhills
Halfmerke Primary School, East Mains 
Hallside Primary School, Drumsagard
Hareleeshill Primary School, Larkhall
Heathery Knowe Primary School, The Murray
High Blantyre Primary School, Blantyre
High Mill Primary School, Carluke
Hunter Primary School, Calderwood
James Aiton Primary School, Cambuslang
Kirkfieldbank Primary School, Kirkfieldbank
Kirklandpark Primary School, Strathaven
Kirkton Primary School, Carluke
Kirktonholme Primary School, West Mains 
Lamington Primary School, Lamington
Lanark Primary School, Lanark
Law Primary School, Law
Leadhills Primary School, Leadhills
Libberton Primary School, Carnwath
Loch Primary School, Springhall
Long Calderwood Primary School, Calderwood
Machanhill Primary School, Larkhall
Maxwellton Primary School, Calderwood
Milton Primary School, Lesmahagow
Mossneuk Primary School, Mossneuk
Mount Cameron Primary School, St Leonards
Mount Cameron Primary School Gaelic Unit, St Leonards
Muiredge Primary School, Uddingston
Murray Primary School, The Murray
Neilsland Primary School, Hamilton
Netherburn Primary School, Netherburn
New Lanark Primary School, Lanark
Newfield Primary School, Stonehouse
Newton Farm Primary School, Newton
Our Lady and St. Anne's Primary School, Hamilton
Our Lady of Lourdes Primary School, The Murray
Park View Primary School, Halfway
Quarter Primary School, Quarter
Rigside Primary School, Rigside
Robert Owen Memorial Primary School, Lanark
Robert Smillie Memorial Primary School, Larkhall
Sandford Primary School, Strathaven
South Park Primary School, The Murray
Spittal Primary School, Spittal 
St. Anthony's Primary School, Springhall
St. Athanasius' Primary School, Carluke
St. Blane's Primary School, Blantyre
St. Bride's Primary School, Bothwell
St. Bride's Primary School, Cambuslang
St. Cadoc's Primary School, Halfway
St. Charles' Primary School, Newton
St. Columbkille's Primary School, Rutherglen
St. Cuthbert's Primary School, Burnbank
St. Elizabeth's Primary School, Hamilton
St. Hilary's Primary School, St Leonards
St. John the Baptist Primary School, Uddingston
St. John's Primary School, Blackwood
St. John's Primary School, Hamilton
St. Joseph's Primary School, Blantyre
St. Kenneth's Primary School, West Mains
St. Leonard's Primary School, Calderwood
St. Louise Primary School, The Murray
St. Mark's Primary School, Hamilton
St. Mark's Primary School, Blairbeth
St. Mary's Primary School, Hamilton
St. Mary's Primary School, Lanark
St. Mary's Primary School, Larkhall
St. Ninian's Primary School, Hamilton
St. Patrick's Primary School, Strathaven
St. Paul's Primary School, Hamilton
St. Peter's Primary School, Hamilton
St. Vincent's Primary School, Greenhills
Stonehouse Primary School, Stonehouse
Tinto Primary School, Symington
Townhill Primary School, Hillhouse
Udston Primary School, Hamilton
Underbank Primary School, Crossford
West Coats Primary School, Cambuslang
Wester Overton Primary School, Strathaven
Wiston Primary School, Biggar
Woodhead Primary School, Woodhead
Woodpark Primary School, Lesmahagow
Woodside Primary School, Silvertonhill

Secondary schools
Biggar High School, Biggar
Calderglen High School, East Kilbride
Calderside Academy, Blantyre
Carluke High School, Carluke
Cathkin High School, Cambuslang
Duncanrig Secondary School, East Kilbride
Hamilton Grammar School, Hamilton
Holy Cross High School, Hamilton
John Ogilvie High School, Hamilton
Lanark Grammar School, Lanark
Larkhall Academy, Larkhall
Lesmahagow High School, Lesmahagow
St Andrew's and St Bride's High School, East Kilbride
Stonelaw High School, Rutherglen
Strathaven Academy, Strathaven
Trinity High School, Eastfield
Uddingston Grammar School, Uddingston

Special schools
Greenburn School, East Kilbride
Hamilton School for the Deaf, Hamilton
Rutherglen High School, Cambuslang
Sanderson High School, East Kilbride
Stanmore House School, Lanark
Victoria Park School, Carluke
West Mains School, East Kilbride

Stirling

Nursery schools
Arnprior Nursery, Arnprior 
Cornton Nursery, Cornton 
Cowie Nursery, Cowie 
Crianlarich Nursery, Crianlarich
Croftamie Nursery, Croftamie 
Fallin Nursery and Out of School Care, Fallin
Hillview Children and Family Centre, Stirling 
Killin Nursery, Killin
Park Drive Nursery, Bannockburn
Raploch Nursery, Raploch
Wellgreen Nursery, Stirling

Primary schools
Aberfoyle Primary School, Aberfoyle
Allan's Primary School, Stirling
Balfron Primary School, Balfron
Bannockburn Primary School, Bannockburn
Borestone Primary School, St. Ninians
Braehead Primary School, Stirling
Bridge of Allan Primary School, Bridge of Allan
Buchlyvie Primary School, Buchlyvie
Callander Primary School, Callander
Cambusbarron Primary School, Cambusbarron
Cornton Primary School, Cornton
Cowie Primary School, Cowie
Crianlarich Primary School, Crianlarich
Deanston Primary School, Deanston
Doune Primary School, Doune
Drymen Primary School, Drymen
Dunblane Primary School, Dunblane
East Plean Primary School, Plean
Fallin Primary School, Fallin
Fintry Primary School, Fintry
Gargunnock Primary School, Gargunnock
Gartmore Primary School, Gartmore
Killearn Primary School, Killearn
Killin Primary School, Killin
Kincardine-In-Menteith Primary School, Stirling
Kippen Primary School, Kippen
Newton Primary School, Dunblane
Our Lady's Primary School, Stirling
Port of Menteith Primary School, Port of Menteith
Raploch Primary School, Raploch
Riverside Primary School, Stirling
St. Margaret's R.C. Primary School, Cowie
St. Mary's Episcopal Primary School, Dunblane
St. Mary's R.C. Primary School, Bannockburn
St. Ninian's Primary School, Stirling
Strathblane Primary School, Blanefield
Strathyre Primary School, Strathyre
Thornhill Primary School, Thornhill

Secondary schools

Balfron High School, Balfron
Bannockburn High School, Bannockburn
Dunblane High School, Dunblane
McLaren High School, Callander
St Modan's High School, Stirling 
Stirling High School, Stirling
Wallace High School, Stirling

Special schools

Ballikinrain Residential School, Balfron
Camphill School
Castleview School, 
Kildean Pre-School
Kildean School
Riverside School
Snowdon School
Whins of Milton School

West Dunbartonshire

Primary schools
Aitkenbar Primary School, Bellsmyre
Balloch Primary School, Balloch
Bonhill Primary School, Bonhill
Braehead Primary School, Dumbarton
Carleith Primary School, Duntocher
Christie Park Primary School, Alexandria
Clydemuir Primary School, Dalmuir
Dalreoch Primary School, Castlehill
Edinbarnet Primary School, Faifley
Gartocharn Primary School, Gartocharn
Gavinburn Primary School, Old Kilpatrick
Goldenhill Primary School, Hardgate
Kilbowie Primary School, Clydebank
Knoxland Primary School, Dumbarton
Lennox Primary School, Bonhill
Levenvale Primary School, Alexandria
Linnvale Primary School, Clydebank
Our Holy Redeemer's Primary School, Clydebank
Our Lady of Loretto Primary School, Dalmuir
Renton Primary School, Renton
St. Eunan's Primary School, Drumry
St. Joseph's Primary School, Faifley
St. Kessog's Primary School, Balloch
St. Martin's Primary School, Renton
St. Mary's Primary School, Alexandria
St. Mary's Primary School, Duntocher
St. Michael's Primary School, Brucehill
St. Patrick's Primary School, Silverton
St. Peter's Primary School, Bellsmyre
St. Ronan's Primary School, Bonhill
St. Stephen's Primary School, Clydebank
Whitecrook Primary School, Clydebank

Secondary schools
Clydebank High School, Clydebank
Dumbarton Academy, Dumbarton 
Our Lady and St Patrick's High School, Dumbarton
St Peter the Apostle High School, Clydebank
Vale of Leven Academy, Alexandria

Special schools
Cunard School, Clydebank
Kilpatrick School, Dalmuir

West Lothian

Infant school (P1-P3)
Dechmont Infant School, Dechmont

Primary schools
Addiewell Primary School, Addiewell
Armadale Primary School, Armdale
Balbardie Primary School, Bathgate
Bankton Primary School, Livingston
Bellsquarry Primary School, Bellsquarry
Blackburn Primary School, Blackburn
Blackridge Primary School, Blackridge
Boghall Primary School, Boghall
Bridgend Primary School, Bridgend
Broxburn Primary School, Broxburn
Calderwood Primary School, East Calder
Carmondean Primary School, Livingston
Croftmalloch Primary School, Whitburn
Deans Primary School, Deans
Dedridge Primary School, Dedridge
East Calder Primary School, East Calder
Eastertoun Primary School, Armadale
Falla Hill Primary School, Fauldhouse
Greenrigg Primary School, Greenrigg
Harrysmuir Primary School, Livingston
Holy Family R.C. Primary School, Winchburgh
Howden St Andrew's Primary School, Howden
Kirkhill Primary School, Broxburn
Kirknewton Primary School, Kirknewton
Knightsridge Primary School, Knightsridge
Letham Primary School, Craigshill
Linlithgow Bridge Primary School, Linlithgow Bridge
Linlithgow Primary School, Linlithgow
Livingston Village Primary School, Livingston Village
Longridge Primary School, Longridge
Low Port Primary School, Linlithgow
Meldrum Primary School, Livingston
Mid Calder Primary School, Mid Calder
Murrayfield Primary School, Blackburn
Our Lady of Lourdes Primary School, Blackburn
Our Lady's R.C. Primary School, Stoneyburn
Parkhead Primary School, West Calder
Peel Primary School, Livingston
Polkemmet Primary School, Whitburn
Pumpherston & Uphall Station Community Primary School, Pumpherston
Riverside Primary School, Craigshill
Seafield Primary School, Seafield
Simpson Primary School, Bathgate
Southdale Primary School, Armadale
Springfield Primary School, Linlithgow
St. Anthony's R.C. Primary School, Armadale
St. Columba's R.C. Primary School, Bathgate
St. John Ogilvie R.C. Primary School, Deans
St. John the Baptist R.C. Primary School, Fauldhouse
St. Joseph's R.C. Primary School, Linlithgow
St. Joseph's R.C. Primary School, Whitburn
St. Mary's R.C. Primary School, Bathgate
St. Mary's R.C. Primary School, Polbeth
St. Nicholas R.C. Primary School, Broxburn
St. Ninian's R.C. Primary School, Livingston
St. Paul's R.C. Primary School, East Calder
St. Thomas' R.C. Primary School, Addiewell
Stoneyburn Primary School, Stoneyburn
Toronto Primary School, Howden
Torphichen Primary School, Torphichen
Uphall Primary School, Uphall
Westfield Primary School, Westfield
Whitdale Primary School, Whitburn
Williamston Primary School, Murieston
Winchburgh Primary School, Winchburgh
Windyknowe Primary School, Bathgate
Woodmuir Primary School, Breich

Secondary schools
Armadale Academy, Armdale
Bathgate Academy, Bathgate
Broxburn Academy, Broxburn
Deans Community High School, Deans
Inveralmond Community High School, Livingston
The James Young High School, Livingston
Linlithgow Academy, Linlithgow
St Kentigern's Academy, Blackburn
St Margaret's Academy, Livingston
West Calder High School, Polbeth
Whitburn Academy, Whitburn

Special schools
Beatlie School, Livingston
Burnhouse School, Whitburn, Bathgate
Cedarbank School, Livingston
Pinewood School, Blackburn
Donaldson's School, Linlithgow

Western Isles

Primary schools
Back School, Isle of Lewis
Balivanich School, Isle of Benbecula
Bernera School, Isle of Lewis (mothballed 2021)
Breasclete School, Isle of Lewis
Castlebay Community School, Isle of Barra (ages 3–18)
Eoligarry School, Barra
Iochdar School, Isle of South Uist
Laxdale School, Isle of Lewis
Leverhulme Memorial School, Leverburgh, Isle of Harris
Lionel School, Isle of Lewis
Sgoil an Rubha, Point, Isle of Lewis
Sgoil an Taobh Siar, Isle of Lewis
Sgoil Dhalabroig, Isle of South Uist
Sgoil na Pairc, Isle of Lewis 
Sgoil nan Loch, Leurbost, Isle of Lewis
Sgoil Uibhish a Tuath, Bayhead, Isle of North Uist
Shawbost School, Isle of Lewis
Sir E Scott School, Tarbert Isle of Harris (ages 3–18)
Stornoway Primary School, Stornoway, Isle of Lewis
Tolsta School, North Tolsta, Isle of Lewis (mothballed 2019)
Tong School, Isle of Lewis
Uig School, Timsgarry, Isle of Lewis

Secondary schools
Castlebay Community School, Isle of Barra (ages 3–18)
Nicolson Institute, Stornoway, Isle of Lewis
Sgoil Lionacleit, Isle of Benbecula
Sir E Scott School, Tarbert Isle of Harris (ages 3–18)

Other schools in Scotland
List of independent schools in Scotland
List of state schools in Scotland (city council areas)
List of state schools in Scotland (council areas excluding cities, A–D)
List of state schools in Scotland (council areas excluding cities, E–H)
List of state schools in Scotland (council areas excluding cities, I–R)

See also
Education in Scotland
Education in the United Kingdom
Education Scotland

External links
The website Friends Reunited has a large index of schools but it is not possible to readily distinguish as to which schools are currently operating or closed.
The website UK Schools & Colleges Database lists currently operating state (and some independent) schools by Local Education Authority and also links to websites of individual schools where available.

S-W
State schools
Schools in Scotland by council area